Erik Mellevold Bråthen (born 16 September 1987) is a retired Norwegian football goalkeeper.

Career statistics

References

1987 births
Living people
Norwegian footballers
Eliteserien players
Kvik Halden FK players
Fredrikstad FK players
Rosenborg BK players
Sportspeople from Fredrikstad
Association football goalkeepers